Admete bruuni is a species of sea snail, a marine gastropod mollusk in the family Cancellariidae, the nutmeg snails.

Description
The shell grows to a length of 22 mm.

Distribution
This marine species occurs in the South Pacific off the Kermadec Islands.

References

External links
 Knudsen J. 1964. Scaphopoda and Gastropoda from depths exceeding 6000 meters. Galathea Report 7: 125–136, page(s): 132–133
 Hemmen J. (2007) Recent Cancellariidae. Annotated and illustrated catalogue of Recent Cancellariidae. Privately published, Wiesbaden. 428 pp. [With amendments and corrections taken from Petit R.E. (2012) A critique of, and errata for, Recent Cancellariidae by Jens Hemmen, 2007. Conchologia Ingrata 9: 1–8.
 Spencer H.G., Willan R.C., Marshall B.A. & Murray T.J. (2011) Checklist of the Recent Mollusca Recorded from the New Zealand Exclusive Economic Zone
 Intergovernmental Oceanographic Commission (IOC) of UNESCO. The Ocean Biogeographic Information System 

Cancellariidae
Gastropods described in 1964